Musiri is a town in Tamil Nadu, India.

Musiri may also refer to:
 Musiri block
 Musiri taluk 
 Musiri division 
 Musiri (state assembly constituency)